Anvil Creek may refer to:

Anvil Creek (Alaska), site of the Anvil Creek Gold Discovery Site
Anvil Creek, New South Wales Australia, site of the former Anvil Creek Mine and now home to the Anvil Creek development in Hunter Valley

See also
Anvil Creek Gold Discovery Site